Listed below are the UCI Women's Teams that competed in the 2010 women's road cycling events organized by the International Cycling Union (UCI) including the 2010 UCI Women's Road World Cup.

Teams overview

Riders

Kuota Speed Kueens

Ages as of 1 January 2010.

Lotto Ladies Team

Ages as of 1 January 2010.

Redsun Cycling Team

Ages as of 1 January 2010.

Topsport Vlaanderen–Thompson

Ages as of 1 January 2010.

Bizkaia–Durango

Ages as of 1 January 2010.

Debabarrena–Kirolgi

Ages as of 1 January 2010.

Lointek

Ages as of 1 January 2010.

ESGL 93–GSD Gestion

Ages as of 1 January 2010.

Vienne Futuroscope

Ages as of 1 January 2010.

Team HTC–Columbia Women

Ages as of 1 January 2010.

Source

Noris Cycling

Ages as of 1 January 2010.

Giant Pro Cycling
Ages as of 1 January 2010.

ACS Chirio–Forno d'Asolo

Ages as of 1 January 2010.

Gauss RDZ Ormu

Ages as of 1 January 2010.

S.C. Michela Fanini Record Rox

Ages as of 1 January 2010.

Team Valdarno

Ages as of 1 January 2010.

Top Girls Fassa Bortolo-Ghezzi

Ages as of 1 January 2010.

Vaiano Solaristech

Ages as of 1 January 2010.

Safi–Pasta Zara

Ages as of 1 January 2010.

Cervélo TestTeam

Ages as of 1 January 2010.

Leontien.nl

Ages as of 1 January 2010.

Nederland Bloeit

Ages as of 1 January 2010.

Hitec Products UCK

Ages as of 1 January 2010.

MTN

Ages as of 1 January 2010.

Fenixs–Petrogradets

Ages as of 1 January 2010.

Alriksson Go:green

Ages as of 1 January 2010.

TIBCO–To The Top
Ages as of 1 January 2010.

References

2010 in women's road cycling
2010